Oludemilade Martin Alejo (born 29 January 1993), known professionally as Ycee (also stylized as YCee), is a Nigerian rapper, singer and songwriter. He gained popularity after his single "Condo", which features vocals by Patoranking, earned him two nominations at the 2015 Nigeria Entertainment Awards. He was also nominated for Best Artist in African Pop at the 2015 All Africa Music Awards and for Next Rated at The Headies 2016. Ycee signed a record deal with Sony Music in October 2016, but terminated his contract with the label in February 2018.

Early life and education
Ycee was born in Festac Town, a housing estate in Lagos State, Nigeria. He completed his basic education at Dr. Soyemi Memorial Nursery and Primary School. He attended the Nigerian Navy Secondary School in Ojo for his secondary education. Ycee studied marine biology at the University of Lagos.

Career
Ycee started his music career in 2012 as an underground rapper. He signed a record deal with Tinny Entertainment. Due to his educational engagements, he took a brief hiatus from music after gaining admission to the University of Lagos. Ycee released the critically acclaimed song "Condo" in May 2015; it was nominated for Best Collaboration of the Year and Best Music Video of the Year at the 2015 Nigeria Entertainment Awards. On 20 July 2015, he released the hit single "Jagaban". Nigerian rapper Olamide asked him to be featured on the remix. He gained further exposure after receiving a nomination for Revelation of the Year at the 2015 MTV Africa Music Awards. Moreover, he was nominated for Best Artist in African Pop at the 2015 All Africa Music Awards.

Ycee sold out a headline gig at the O2 Academy Islington on 12 January 2018. The gig featured additional performances from his label mates Bella Alubo, Sona, Eugy, Ms. Banks and Flosha. On 15 January 2019, he announced on Instagram that he left Tinny Entertainment. He also announced the launch of his record label ANBT, an acronym for Ain't Nobody Badder Than.

Ycee released his debut studio album Ycee vs Zaheer on 8 November 2019. It is a mixture of hip-hop, trap, Afrobeats, Afro-house, hyphy, R&B and alte. The album serves as the follow-up to his 8-track debut EP First Wave (2017) and his collaborative EP with Bella Alubo, titled Late Night Vibrations (2018). The album was produced by Adey, Jay Bidz, Ballertosh, Fanatix, BeatsbyKarma, Syn X, Krizbeatz, Jay Popping, Buzzin Producer, AP Da Don, Two Seven, Elmore, Willis Give Dem and KO. It features collaborations with Davido, Niniola, Phyno, Ms Banks and Dapo Tuburna.

Over the course of his career and since his rise to prominence, Ycee has featured on notable records to break upcoming artists. He featured on records to break his label mate Dapo Turbuna "Nothing" Remix in 2016, Label Mate Bella on Radio in 2017 before going ahead to create a joint EP with her (Late Night Vibrations). Ycee also featured on Big Man Doingz by Arosino alongside Dapo Tuburna and Karma. Some Say it was his way of giving back to emerging artistes as he was once on the receiving end of such impact through Olamide on his remix to Jagaban, his breakthrough single.

Discography

Studio albums
Ycee vs Zaheer (2019)

EPs
First Wave (2017)
Late Night Vibrations (with Bella Alubo) (2018)
Love Drunk (2021)

Selected songs

Awards and nominations

See also

List of Nigerian musicians

References

External links

1993 births
Living people
People from Lagos State
Musicians from Lagos State
Nigerian male musicians
Nigerian male rappers
Yoruba musicians
English-language singers from Nigeria
Yoruba-language singers
The Headies winners